The 2018–19 season was Wigan Athletic's 87th year in existence and their first back in the Championship, after gaining promotion the previous season. Along with competing in the league, the club also participated in the FA Cup and EFL Cup. The season covered the period from 1 July 2018 to 30 June 2019.

Change in ownership 
During the season International Entertainment Corporation (IEC) completed their acquisition of the club, stadium and training grounds in a £22m deal.  Chairman David Sharpe stepped down following the completion of the takeover along with other board members and was replaced by Darren Royle, his father Joe Royle and Thomas Chan.

First-team squad

Statistics

|-
!colspan=14|Player(s) out on loan:

|-
!colspan=14|Player(s) who left the club:

|}

Goals record

Disciplinary record

Transfers

Transfers in

Loans in

Transfers out

Loans out

Competitions

Pre-season friendlies
Wigan Athletic announced they would face Tranmere Rovers in a pre-season friendly.

Championship

League table

Results summary

Results by matchday

Matches
On 21 June 2018, the Championship fixtures for the forthcoming season were announced.

FA Cup

The third round draw was made live on BBC by Ruud Gullit and Paul Ince from Stamford Bridge on 3 December 2018.

EFL Cup

On 15 June 2018, the draw for the first round was made in Vietnam.

References

Wigan Athletic F.C. seasons
Wigan Athletic